Mydata (stylised as mydata) is the fourth studio album by Australian experimental pop musician Katie Dey. It was released through Run for Cover Records on 24 July 2020.

Release
The album's first single, "Dancing", was released on 24 June 2020, The second single named "Happiness" was released on 7 July 2020.

Critical reception

Teodor Zetko of Exclaim! reviewed "Mydata conjures real emotion from the digital void." Colin Joyce of Pitchfork said "Mydata suggests the possibility of perseverance, connection, and kindness to oneself and others. Dey finds peace in knowing that this kind of love is just as real as any other."

Track listing

References

2020 albums
Katie Dey albums
Run for Cover Records albums